Fletcher Stewart Pickering "Tommy" Thomas (June 7, 1897  November 9, 1957) was a politician in Ontario, Canada. He was a Progressive Conservative member of the Legislative Assembly of Ontario from 1945 to 1957 who represented the central Ontario riding of Elgin. He served as a cabinet minister under Leslie Frost, holding two successive positions between 1951 and 1956.

Background
Born in 1897 in Toronto Township, Ontario to Joseph P. Thomas and Maggie Stewart, Thomas and his mother moved to Streetsville nine years later following the death of his father.

In 1915, he enrolled at the Ontario Agricultural College, but put his studies on hold in 1916 to enlist as a gunner in the Canadian Field Artillery. He served in France and was also one of the "Polar Bears" in the North Russia Intervention before being discharged in 1919.

Returning to OAC, he graduated in 1922 and became an agricultural agent working in Grey County, Port Arthur and Elgin County (serving in the last area for 19 years). He became a farmer in Elgin County in 1935, specializing in tobacco and apples. In 1940, he was instrumental in organizing the first International Plowing Match to be held there.

He died in 1957. He is buried in Elmdale Memorial Park Cemetery.

Politics
In the 1945 Ontario election, Thomas ran as a Progressive Conservative candidate in the riding of Elgin, defeating Mitchell Hepburn. Modest in victory, he said in his acceptance speech, "I am no wonder boy, and I repeat, I don't crave publicity. My ambition now is to be a good member for Elgin and to spend the rest of my time looking after my farm."

He would later be reelected in the 1948, 1951 and 1955 elections.

In 1951, he was appointed as Minister of Public Works in the government of Leslie Frost, where he was in charge of coordinating the province's conservation projects. In 1953 he was appointed as Minister of Agriculture. As Ministers of Agriculture, he led the organization of the first cooperative marketing schemes for fruit and tobacco growers. He also went to the Supreme Court of Canada in order to clarify the status of Ontario's agricultural marketing legislation. He resigned from his role as Minister in 1956 because of ill health, but continued to serve in the Legislature.

On his death in 1957, Leslie Frost said in tribute, "In both posts, the tremendous contribution he made to the great farming community of Ontario, and in connection with conservation works, was of a high order indeed."

Cabinet posts

References

External links 
 

1897 births
1957 deaths
People from Elgin County
Progressive Conservative Party of Ontario MPPs
Ontario Agricultural College alumni
Canadian Expeditionary Force soldiers
Canadian military personnel of the Russian Civil War
Royal Regiment of Canadian Artillery personnel
Canadian military personnel of World War I
Canadian military personnel from Ontario
Politicians from Mississauga